Jordan Anthony DeSilva (born 4 May 1990) is a Bermudian cricketer. DeSilva is a left-handed batsman who bowls left-arm fast-medium.

DeSilva was selected as part of Bermuda Under-19s sixteen man squad for the 2008 Under-19 Cricket World Cup, making his Youth One Day International (YODI) debut against Bangladesh Under-19s, with him making a further four YODIs in the tournament. He later made his senior debut for Bermuda in a List A match against Uganda in 2009 at the National Stadium, Hamilton. The following year he made a second List A appearance against Namibia during Bermuda's tour of Namibia in April 2010. In July 2010, he made his first-class debut against the United Arab Emirates at Hamilton in the Intercontinental Shield. He followed this up immediately after that fixture making a single List A appearance against the same opposition, as well as playing two Twenty20 matches.

References

External links
Jordan DeSilva at ESPNcricinfo
Jordan DeSilva at CricketArchive

1990 births
Living people
Bermudian cricketers